Seven is the seventh studio album by American rock singer-songwriter Bob Seger, released in 1974.

Background and recording
Seven was the first Seger album to feature 'The Silver Bullet Band', which he would steadily rely on for the rest of his career. The album gained notorious recognition and is a fan favorite despite its rarity. The very successful tour for this album was kicked off with Seger and his newly formed Silver Bullets as the opening act for Kiss. Kiss asked Seger and the band to support them for a few shows. After seeing the band's first set, they offered Seger the rest of the tour, which gained the band much-needed recognition.

Early vinyl copies of the album featured the word 'contrasts' at the bottom of the cover, leading people to believe the album had two titles. Others believed the album was titled 'Seven Contrasts'. However, Contrasts is the name of the artwork featured on the album. The word in parenthesis is simply a reference to the artwork rather than an actual subtitle or title of the record.

A later bootleg of the album released in the 1980s was entitled Seven Worlds.

Reception 

Although the album failed to make the Billboard Top 200 albums chart, the single "Get Out of Denver" reached number 80 on the Pop Singles chart.  Critics and longtime Seger fans tend to regard the album as a lost classic, much like its predecessor Back in '72.  For example, Stephen Thomas Erlewine of AllMusic retrospectively gave the album 5/5 stars, calling it "one of [Seger's] strongest, hardest-hitting rock records". Summing up, Erlewine wrote:

Track listing

Personnel 

Silver Bullet Band
 Bob Seger – guitar, vocals
 Drew Abbott – lead guitar (A5, B1, B4)
 Tom Cartmell – saxophone (A2, B2)
 Rick Manasa – organ, piano (A5, B1, B4)
 Robyn Robins – Mellotron (B4)
 Chris Campbell – bass guitar (A4, A5, B1, B4)
 Charlie Allen Martin – drums (A5, B1, B4)

Additional musicians 
 Dave Doran – lead guitar (A2)
 Jim McCarty – lead guitar (A1, B2), slide guitar (A3)
 Charlie McCoy – rhythm guitar (A1, A3)
 Bill Meuller – lead guitar (A4)
 David Briggs – piano (A1–A3, B2, B3)
 John Harris – organ (B3)
 Bobby Woods – piano (B3)
 Tommy Cogbill – bass (A1–A3, B2, B3)
 Kenny Buttrey – drums (A1–A3, B2, B3)
 Randy Meyers – drums (A4)

Production

 Producers: Punch Andrews, Bob Seger
 Engineer: Gene Eichelberger, Jim Bruzzese, Greg Miller
 Cover art by Thomas Weschler
 Photography by Thomas Weschler, Scott Sparling

Charts 
Singles – Billboard (United States)

References 

Bob Seger albums
1974 albums
Albums produced by Punch Andrews
Reprise Records albums